Ganjali Sabahi (was born 1906 in Marand, East Azerbaijan — died 1990 in Tehran) was an Iranian writer of Azerbaijani literature. He was one of the contemporary writers of Azerbaijan, that was written in Azerbaijani language.

References

External links 
 Biography of Ganjali Sabahi to Azerbaiani language
 Biography of Ganjali Sabahi to Azerbaiani language

1943 births
1990 deaths
People from Marand
Azerbaijani-language writers